James Dutton may refer to:
James Dutton, 1st Baron Sherborne (1744–1820), British peer
James Dutton, 3rd Baron Sherborne (1804–1883), British peer
James Dutton, 6th Baron Sherborne (1873–1949), British peer
James Dutton (actor) (born 1982), English actor
James Dutton (astronaut) (born 1968), American astronaut
James Dutton (Royal Marines officer) (born 1954), former Governor of Gibraltar